Artik Basketball Club, also known as Artik Man Holding for sponsorship reasons, is a professional basketball team based in Artik, Armenia. It currently plays in the Armenia Basketball League A.

History
Founded in 2017, the club is one of the seven founders of the Armenia Basketball League A. In the first season, the club ended as runner-up of the league.

In 2019, the club did not register in the League A.

Season by season

Current roster

References

External links 
 Eurobasket.com Artik BC page

Basketball teams in Armenia
Basketball teams established in 2017
2017 establishments in Armenia